William Howard Matthews (29 November 1885 – 9 February 1963) was an English football goalkeeper who played for Port Vale, Burton United, Oldham Athletic, Halifax Town, Chester, and Oswestry Town. With Oldham he finished second in the Second Division in 1909–10 and then second in the First Division in 1914–15.

Career
Matthews played for local sides Oldbury St. John's and Langley St. Michael's, before joining Burslem Port Vale as an amateur in May 1906. Preferred to Arthur Box, he played 26 Second Division and four FA Cup games in the 1906–07 season. He was released from the Athletic Ground at the end of the 1906–07 season when the club suffered a financial crisis. He moved on to Burton United, who themselves resigned from the Football League at the end of the 1906–07 season. He then signed with Oldham Athletic. The "Latics" finished third in the Second Division in 1907–08, and then finished sixth in 1908–09 before securing promotion with a second-place finish in 1909–10. Oldham then posted a seventh-place finish in the First Division in 1910–11, before finishing 18th in 1911–12, ninth in 1912–13, fourth in 1913–14, and second in 1914–15 – one point behind champions Everton. He returned to Boundary Park after the conclusion of World War I, as the club finished 17th in 1919–20, 19th in 1920–21 and 1921–22, before being relegated in last place in 1922–23. Athletic finished seventh in the Second Division in 1923–24, 18th in 1924–25, and then seventh again in 1925–26. He returned to Port Vale a remarkable 19 years since his release, in October 1926, and played 21 league games in the 1926–27 campaign ahead of rivals Tom Fern, George Holdcroft, and Alex Binnie. However, he was seriously injured from a kick to the back by South Shields winger Alex Trotter in a 3–3 draw on 5 February. He then lost his first team place to Alf Bennett, and made 16 league and cup appearances in the 1927–28 season. He was given a free transfer away from The Old Recreation Ground in May 1928 and despite being in his 40s managed to go on play for Halifax Town. The "Shaymen" finished 13th in Third Division North, before dropping into the re-election zone in 1929–30. He later played for Chester and Oswestry Town.

Career statistics
Source:

Honours
Oldham Athletic
Football League Second Division second-place promotion: 1909–10

References

People from Oldham
People from Oldbury, West Midlands
English footballers
Footballers from Oldham
Association football goalkeepers
Port Vale F.C. players
Burton United F.C. players
Oldham Athletic A.F.C. players
Halifax Town A.F.C. players
Chester City F.C. players
Oswestry Town F.C. players
English Football League players
English Football League representative players
1885 births
1963 deaths